Danas Andriulionis (born 25 November 1951 in Rokiškis) is a Lithuanian painter and a member of the Lithuanian Artists' Association. He studied in  Pakruojis,  and graduated  Rokiškis T. Vaižgantas school. In 1975, he joined the VISI, specialising in architecture, and in 1979 graduated from the Vilnius Art Academy, in the specialty of art designer. Since 2001, he has been a teacher of painting composition.

Creative activities
Andriulionis has exhibited at more than 300 different exhibitions and projects since 1992. He has arranged more than 60 personal exhibitions and taken part in joint exhibitions with prominent Lithuanian and foreign artists in France (1992), Denmark (2000), USA (2002), Hungary (2003), Sweden (2005), Finland (2005), Russia (2006), Poland (2006), Latvia (2007), and Spain (2008). International exhibitions he has participated in include: Klaipeda Art Exhibition Hall and Baroti Gallery (2001, 2005), "Baptism in the art" (Klaipeda, 2002, 2003), "Quo Vadis" (Budapest, Hungary, 2003), exhibition "Vilius Orvydai remember " (Kėdainių 2005), "Signs of the Time" (Klaipeda, 2006), "Christmas exhibition" (Klaipeda, 2006), the exhibition "Minor Lithuania paintings garden“ (Bitėnai, Šilutės, 2006), "Mega Plaza" (Klaipeda, 2007), "V world Samogitians" exhibition (Plunge, 2007); Project "Aquarium" (Klaipeda, 2001), "Year horizon 04" (Klaipeda, 2005), "Wind and Sea" (Stockholm, Sweden, 2005), and "Flight Stroke" (Klaipeda, 2008).

Later career
Andriulionis was granted the art creator status of the Republic of Lithuania in 2005, and has been awarded more than 40 letters of appreciation and prizes. He has created scenography for four theatre productions, and co-wrote the book "On Wings of Music" in 2008. He is  actively  involved in Klaipeda and Lithuania creative life, and is a member of the painters group "INDIVIDUALISTS".

Andriulionis' work is held in six museums, and in private collections worldwide.

Bibliography 
Klaipėda and Klaipėda,Time labeled Volume II, in 2013, Vilnius. 96 p.

Who is who in Lithuania, Gold Millennium Edition, 2009, Kaunas. 378 p.

Who is who in Lithuania, Lithuanian State Yearbook 1990-2010, 176 p.

References

1951 births
Living people
Lithuanian painters
People from Panevėžys County